Piccadilly Slant-Abraham's Cove is a local service district and designated place in the Canadian province of Newfoundland and Labrador. It is located on the island of Newfoundland, along St. George's Bay, on the Port au Port Peninsula. The DPL consists of the fishing villages of Abraham's Cove and Piccadilly.

Geography 
Piccadilly Slant-Abraham's Cove is in Newfoundland within Subdivision E of Division No. 4.

Communities 
Abraham's Cove
According to the local population, the Abraham's Cove site was first settled in the late 19th century by the Duffey family, of mixed Acadian and Mi'kmaq ancestry. The population kept livestock and fished for cod, herring, and lobster. With the increasing scarcity of commercial fish, many residents found employment in the nearby Ernest Harmon US AFB in Stephenville, which operated from 1941 to 1966, or at the provincial highways depot. Today, very few local residents still engage in fishing, and many men and women seek seasonal employment elsewhere in the province or in Nova Scotia.

Piccadilly
Piccadilly has its own liquor and confectionery store, which is called Parkview. Its park is located a kilometre from Parkview. It is a beautiful place for camping, the beach is sandy and a lot of people swim and go clamming on the shoals. It has a great view of the bay and nature trails. Camp sites, water, bathrooms, changing rooms, and electricity are available. Down the road about one kilometre is Piccadilly Central High School, which is located near a body of water called Piccadilly Bay which end at an old wooden bridge known as "The Big Hole". There is a wharf across from the Colliers, and marine centre, where the fishermen sell lobsters and fish. There is a church called Our Lady of Fatima where the community gathers on Sundays.   In the early 1960s, Piccadilly housed the only theatre west of Stephenville.  It was known for showing very old, black and white movies during the winter months while warming its clientele with a wood-burning stove.

Demographics 

Government 
Piccadilly Slant-Abraham's Cove is a local service district (LSD) that is governed by a committee responsible for the provision of certain services to the community. The chair of the LSD committee is Troy Skinner.

Education 
Piccadilly Central High School opened its doors to high school students on the Port au Port Peninsula in September 1998. After being an elementary school since 1975.

See also 
List of communities in Newfoundland and Labrador
List of designated places in Newfoundland and Labrador
List of local service districts in Newfoundland and Labrador

References 

Populated coastal places in Canada
Designated places in Newfoundland and Labrador
Local service districts in Newfoundland and Labrador